Isiah Pacheco (born March 2, 1999) is an American football running back for the Kansas City Chiefs of the National Football League (NFL). Nicknamed the Pachinko Machine, he played college football at Rutgers and was drafted by the Chiefs in the seventh round of the 2022 NFL Draft. In his rookie season with the Chiefs, he won Super Bowl LVII.

Early life
Pacheco was born in Vineland, New Jersey to Felicia Cannon and his father Julio Pacheco. He is the youngest of five siblings and his father is of Puerto Rican descent. He started his football playing career at a very young age for the Vineland Blitz (Pop Warner Football League) in Cumberland County, New Jersey. Pacheco attended Vineland High School, where he played both quarterback and running back.  His senior year he helped the Fighting Clan win the Thanksgiving Day Classic against the rival Millville Senior High School Thunderbolts.

College career 
Pacheco was heavily recruited by Syracuse, Maryland, Rutgers, Virginia Tech, and other football programs along the East Coast. He committed to Rutgers University on June 21, 2017.

Pacheco saw consistent playing time in each of his four collegiate seasons. He finished his college career having amassed 563 rushing attempts for 2,442 yards (4.3 ypc) with 18 rushing touchdowns. He also caught 47 passes for 249 yards and one touchdown.

Collegiate statistics

Professional career 

Pacheco was selected in the seventh round with the 251st overall pick of the 2022 NFL Draft by the Kansas City Chiefs.

2022 
In his NFL debut in week 1 against the Arizona Cardinals, Pacheco scored his first career NFL rushing touchdown on a 3-yard run. He recorded his first career start in the Chiefs week 7 game against the San Francisco 49ers. In a Week 11 matchup against the Los Angeles Chargers, Pacheco rushed for a career-high 107 yards on 15 carries.

Pacheco is the all-time leading season scrimmage yards leader for a rookie running back drafted in the seventh round. He finished the regular season with 830 rushing yards and 130 receiving yards (a total of 960 scrimmage yards), alongside 5 touchdowns on the ground.  He returned 29 kickoffs for 597 yards.
 
In his first professional season, Pacheco was the starting running back for the Chiefs in Super Bowl LVII. In the Super Bowl, Pacheco had 76 yards and a touchdown as the Chiefs defeated the Philadelphia Eagles 38–35.

NFL career statistics

Regular season

Playoffs

Personal life
Pacheco has overcome tragedy as his brother Travoise Cannon was killed in January 2016 and his sister Celeste Cannon was murdered in September 2017. He has tattoos of his sister and brother in a mural on his right arm alongside other tattoos representing essential parts of his roots, including one representing New Jersey, Vineland South High School and Rutgers University.

References

External links 
 
 Kansas City Chiefs bio
 Rutgers Scarlet Knights bio

1999 births
American football running backs
Kansas City Chiefs players
Living people
People from Vineland, New Jersey
American sportspeople of Dominican Republic descent
Players of American football from New Jersey
Rutgers Scarlet Knights football players
Sportspeople from Cumberland County, New Jersey
Vineland High School alumni